Lego A/S (trade name: The Lego Group) is a Danish toy production company based in Billund, Denmark. It manufactures Lego-brand toys, consisting mostly of interlocking plastic bricks. The Lego Group has also built several amusement parks around the world, each known as Legoland, and operates numerous retail stores.

The company was founded on August 10, 1932, by Ole Kirk Christiansen. The name Lego is derived from the Danish words , meaning "play well".

History

The Lego company was founded in 1932 by Ole Kirk Christiansen, a carpenter whose primary business of producing household goods had suffered due to the Great Depression. Initially producing wooden toys, the company later developed a system of interlocking bricks. Manufacturing of plastic Lego bricks began in Denmark in 1947. After a fire in the woodworking department, Ole's son, Godtfred, decided to stop the production of wooden toys and solely focus on plastic products and the Lego system. He also built an airport in Billund to facilitate the sale of Lego toys around the world.

In North America, Samsonite managed the Lego brand from 1961 until 1972 (United States) and 1986 (Canada).

The name "LEGO" is a contraction of the words Danish: "leg godt" (English: "play well"). However, the name also means in Latin either "I collect", "I compose" or "I read". These additional meanings, the first two of which are very relevant, only made sense when the company started making plastic blocks with knobs (lego blocks) so that they could be put together.

Trademark and patents

Since the expiry of the last standing Lego patent in 1989, a number of companies have produced interlocking bricks that are similar to Lego bricks. The toy company Tyco Toys produced such bricks for a time; other competitors include Mega Bloks and Best-Lock. These competitor products are typically "compatible" with Lego bricks, and are often marketed at a lower cost than Lego sets.

One such competitor is Coko, manufactured by Chinese company Tianjin Coko Toy Co., Ltd. In 2002, Lego Group's Swiss subsidiary Interlego AG sued the company for copyright infringement. A trial court found many Coko bricks to be infringing; Coko was ordered to cease manufacture of the infringing bricks, publish a formal apology in the Beijing Daily, and pay a small fee in damages to Interlego. On appeal, the Beijing High People's Court upheld the trial court's ruling.

In 2003, The Lego Group won a lawsuit in Norway against the marketing group Biltema for its sale of Coko products, on the grounds that the company used product confusion for marketing purposes.

Also in 2003, a large shipment of Lego-like products marketed under the name "Enlighten" was seized by Finnish customs authorities. The packaging of the Enlighten products was similar to official Lego packaging. Their Chinese manufacturer failed to appear in court, and thus Lego won a default action ordering the destruction of the shipment. Lego Group footed the bill for the disposal of the 54,000 sets, citing a desire to avoid brand confusion and protect consumers from potentially inferior products.

In 2004, Best-Lock Construction Toys defeated a patent challenge from Lego in the Oberlandesgericht, Hamburg.

The Lego Group has attempted to trademark the "Lego Indicia", the studded appearance of the Lego brick, hoping to stop production of Mega Bloks. On 24 May 2002, the Federal Court of Canada dismissed the case, asserting the design is functional and therefore ineligible for trademark protection. The Lego Group's appeal was dismissed by the Federal Court of Appeal on 14 July 2003. In October 2005, the Supreme Court ruled unanimously that "Trademark law should not be used to perpetuate monopoly rights enjoyed under now-expired patents" and held that Mega Bloks can continue to manufacture their bricks.

Because of fierce competition from copycat products, the company has always responded by being proactive in their patenting and has over 600 United States–granted design patents to their name.

Financial results

In the following year, almost one thousand employees were laid off, due to budget cuts. However, in October 2004, on reporting an even larger deficit, Kristiansen also stepped down as president, while placing  of his private funds into the company.

It also cut expenditures and disposed of amusement parks and a factory in Switzerland.

The increased profit was due to the enormous popularity of the new brand Ninjago, which became the company's biggest product introduction ever.

First half-year sales were driven by double-digit growth across all geographical regions and strong product innovation on themes such as Lego Ninjago, Lego Elves and Lego Creator.

The Lego Group announced on 4 September 2017 its intention to cut  jobs following reduced revenue and profit in the first half of the year, the first reported decrease in 13 years. The revenue losses are due to a more competitive environment, where the company has to compete not only against its traditional competitors Mattel and Hasbro, but also against technology companies such as Sony or Microsoft as more children use mobile devices for entertainment. The job cuts account for 8 percent of the company's total work force. In May 2018, the company made it to Forbes top 100 World's Most Valuable Brands 2018, being 97th on the list.

Legoland

The Lego Group has built eleven amusement parks around the world, each known as Legoland. Each park features large-scale Lego models of famous landmarks and miniature Lego models of famous cities, along with Lego themed rides. The first Legoland park was built in Lego's home town of Billund in Denmark. This was followed by Legoland Windsor in England, Legoland California in Carlsbad, US and Legoland Deutschland in Günzburg, Germany. In addition, Legoland Sierksdorf was opened in 1973, but soon closed in 1976.

Under the terms of the deal, The Lego Group would take a  share in Merlin Entertainments and positions on their board. The sale of the theme parks was part of a wider strategy to restructure the company to focus on the core business of toy products.

In 2010, Merlin Entertainments opened the first Legoland water park at the Legoland California site. On 15 October 2011, Merlin Entertainments opened their first new Legoland park, Legoland Florida, in Winter Haven, Florida. It is the largest Legoland opened to date at 145 acres, and also only one of the Legoland parks opened in the United States. The other Legoland (opened at a later date) water park was opened near the same location on 26 May 2012 after only four months of construction.

Merlin Entertainments opened their second new Legoland park in Nusajaya, Malaysia under the name Legoland Malaysia on 22 September 2012. It is the first Legoland in Asia and was quickly followed by another Lego-themed water park in the same area. The first Lego hotel has also opened near the site. People who stay in the hotel will also get tickets to the theme park and water park. The September 2016 they opened Legoland Dubai. In addition, they opened four new Legoland Discovery Centres, which take the Legoland concept and scale it down to suit a retail park environment.

Legoland Japan Resort was opened in 2017 in Nagoya, Japan.

Legoland Water Park Gardaland in Castelnuovo del Garda, Italy and Legoland New York in Goshen, New York were opened in 2021.

In June 2019, The Lego Group purchased the remaining shares in Merlin Entertainments which they did not own and privatised the company. This returned the operation of the Legoland parks to the control of The Lego Group.

Retail stores

The Lego Group operates 171 retail stores in North America and Europe (99 in the United States, 17 in the United Kingdom, 18 in Germany, 13 in Canada, 9 in France, 6 in Poland, 3 in Denmark, 4 in the Netherlands, 2 in Austria, 2 in Belgium, 2 in Sweden, 1 in Spain and 1 in Ireland.). The Lego Group also franchised its store brand to Majid Al Futtaim Group, which opened 6 stores in 2015 (4 in the United Arab Emirates, and 2 in Kuwait). In 2023 there is a total of 423 stores operated by franchisees, mostly in Australia, Asia and South America.

Europe

October 2002 saw a significant change in The Lego Group's direct retail policy with the opening of the first so-called Lego Brand Store in Cologne, Germany. The second, in Milton Keynes, UK, followed quickly – several dozen more opened worldwide over the next few years, and most of the existing stores have been remodelled on the new Brand Store template. One of the distinctive features of these new stores is the inclusion of a "Pick-A-Brick" system that allows customers to buy individual bricks in bulk quantities. How a customer buys Lego pieces at a Pick-A-Brick is quite simple: customers fill a large or small cup or bag with their choice of Lego bricks from a large and varied selection and purchase it. The opening of most of these stores, including the 2003 opening of one in the Birmingham Bull Ring shopping centre in England, have been marked by the production of a new, special, limited edition, commemorative Lego Duplo piece.

Lego opened the first brand store in its home country Denmark in Copenhagen on 13 December 2010. In 2016, three stores opened in Italy: one in Milan, one in the shopping center near the Orio al Serio International Airport in Bergamo, and another in Verona. On the 18 August 2022, Ireland's first Lego store was opened in Dublin on Grafton Street. On 2 December 2022 an official store was opened in Brescia, bringing the total number of Lego stores in Italy to 29. In 2023 there were a total of 66 stores in Europe, which are operated by Lego itself. In London at Leicester Square, there is the largest Lego store in the world, with an area of 805 m2.

North America
In 1992, when the Mall of America opened in Bloomington, Minnesota, one of its premier attractions was the Lego Imagination Center (LIC). An imagination centre is a large Lego store with displays of Lego sculptures and a play area with bins of bricks to build with. The store inventory includes a large selection of Lego sets for sale, including sets which are advertised in Lego catalogues as "Not Available in Any Store". A second imagination centre opened at the Disney Springs (formerly Downtown Disney) at Walt Disney World Resort in Orlando, Florida. Between 1999 and 2005, Lego opened 24 further stores in North America in 23 states. As of 2023, there are 112 Lego stores operating in North America in 35 US states and five Canadian provinces. These stores sell various Lego merchandise, including minifigures, Pick-a-Brick, and custom packaged minifigures.

India
The first Lego store in India was opened in Chennai, Tamil Nadu in March 2014 by Funskool, under licence from the Lego Group. But India's only operating Lego store in 2023 opened in Mumbai International Airport duty free in 2021.

Lego Interactive
Lego Interactive (formerly Lego Media and later Lego Software) was the video game publishing division of The Lego Group. The company was founded as Lego Media in 1996 and headquartered in London, England. In February 1999, Lego Media announced their move into the girls' software industry, starting with Lego Friends. In May 2002, the company announced to begin distributing their titles through Electronic Arts. Eventually, The Lego Group opted out of the video game business and Lego Interactive was shut down in 2004. Former Lego Interactive staff opened Giant Interactive Entertainment to publish future Lego titles, which later became part of TT Games.

Lego Media also operated a motion picture division, which produced the BBC children's series Little Robots for Cosgrove Hall Films. In 2003, this division was rebranded to Create TV and Film Limited, and became independent from The Lego Group under Lego's majority owner Kirkbi A/S, which allowed Create TV and Film to branch onto other projects. The company later produced Bionicle: Mask of Light, Bionicle 2: Legends of Metru Nui and Bionicle 3: Web of Shadows for Creative Capers Entertainment. In 2005, Kirkbi A/S sold Create TV and Film to its chief executive officer, Vanessa Chapman, and the company was renamed Create Media Ventures Limited. The sale included Little Robots but excluded the Bionicle movies, which were retained by The Lego Group. Create was later dissolved in August 2016.

Toy production

Lego products are mass-produced, packaged and shipped on a large scale.

Lego Produktion AG was a major production facility for Lego. It was founded in Switzerland in 1974. At the time of its announced closing in 2001, 30% of the world production of Lego was produced at the Swiss facility in Baar. The Baar facility eventually closed in 2004.

In April 1962, the Lego Group began producing miniature tires; it became the largest tire manufacturing company in 2011, when it produced 381 million tires that year.

Environmental issues

Lego acknowledges the impact of its operations on the environment, in particular in areas such as climate change, resource and energy use and waste. All manufacturing sites are certified according to the environmental standard ISO 14001. The first Borkum Riffgrund 1 wind turbines off the coast of Germany began producing electricity in February 2015, which will help The Lego Group reach its goal of being based 100% on renewable energy by 2020. The company claims to recycle 90% of its waste and that it had made its operations nearly one-third more energy efficient over the five-year period ending on 31 December 2013. It is seeking alternatives to crude oil as the raw material for its bricks. In June 2015, this resulted in the establishment of the Lego Sustainable Materials Centre, which is expected to recruit more than 100 employees, as a significant step towards the 2030 ambition of finding and implementing sustainable alternatives to current materials.

Gender equality and human rights

In January 2014, a handwritten letter to Lego from a seven-year-old American girl, Charlotte Benjamin, received widespread attention in the media. In it the young author complained that there were "more Lego boy people and barely any Lego girls" and observed that "all the girls did was sit at home, go to the beach, and shop, and they had no jobs, but the boys went on adventures, worked, saved people … even swam with sharks".

In June 2014, it was announced that Lego would be launching a new "Research Institute" collection featuring female scientists including a female chemist, palaeontologist, and astronomer. The science-themed project was selected as the latest Lego Ideas winner, and was submitted by Ellen Kooijman, a geochemist in Stockholm. Lego denied claims that the set was introduced to placate criticism of the company by activists, pointing to its Lego Ideas origins. The Research Institute range sold out within a week of its online release in August 2014. The BBC's Tom de Castella reported that Kooijman was pleased with the set's final design, despite the addition of face make-up to her original proposal, and that Becky Francis, professor of education and social justice at King's College London, who had been "very, very disappointed" by Lego Friends, is a fan.

In June 2021, Lego released a set entitled "Everyone Is Awesome" to celebrate and recognize the LGBTQ+ community. The set includes over 300 pieces and has 11 monochrome minifigures in the colours of the rainbow.

In October 2021, Lego Group launched a campaign named "Ready for Girls" as part of its celebration of the UN's International Day of the Girl. The company also announced its plan to remove gender stereotypes from the toy(s) following a review of a study commissioned by the Geena Davis Institute on Gender in Media.

On 3 March 2022, during the 2022 Russian invasion of Ukraine, the LEGO Foundation stated it would donate approximately US$16.5million to organizations including UNICEF, Save the Children, and the Danish Red Cross for emergency relief efforts.

In April 2022, The LEGO foundation announced the launch of the companies $20 million play-based learning initiative. The grant program launched as part of Autism Acceptance month, is in support of innovative play-based learning for neurodivergent children and in turn will award funding to 25 enterprises in support of the innovative learning for autistic children and children with ADHD.

Logos
Below are historical images of the Lego logo throughout the company's existence.

References

External links

Multinational companies headquartered in Denmark
Manufacturing companies of Denmark
Companies based in Billund Municipality
Danish companies established in 1932
Toy companies established in 1932
Privately held companies of Denmark
Purveyors to the Court of Denmark
Toy companies of Denmark
Toy retailers
Creative Commons-licensed authors
Toy retailers of the United States